Homoranthus floydii is a plant in the myrtle family Myrtaceae and is endemic to New South Wales.

Description
Homoranthus floydii is easily distinguished from all other species of Homoranthus by its erect habit, shiny leaves that appear more pointed near the stem and rounded at the tip, long gaps between leaf nodes and particularly long flower stems. Flowering occurs from August to November and fruits mature from September to December.

Taxonomy and naming
Homoranthus floydii was first formally described in 1991 by Lyndley Craven and S.R Jones and the description was published in Australian Systematic Botany. The specific epithet (floydii) honours the Australian botanist, Alexander Floyd.

Distribution and habitat
This species is endemic to the Glenreagh district of north-eastern New South Wales, where it grows on shallow rocky soils derived from sandstone in shrubby woodland.

Conservation status
This is a rare species with a restricted distribution and given an appropriated ROTAP conservation code of 2RC-t (Briggs and Leigh 1996).

References

External links
 The Australasian Virtual Herbarium – Occurrence data for Homoranthus floydii

Flora of New South Wales
Myrtales of Australia
floydii
Plants described in 1991